Orbital Resonance is a science fiction novel by John Barnes. It is the first of four books comprising the Century Next Door series, followed by Kaleidoscope Century, Candle, and The Sky So Big and Black.

Orbital Resonance was nominated for the James Tiptree Jr. Award (now Otherwise Award) in 1991 and the Nebula Award for Best Novel in 1992.

Critical reaction
Writer Jo Walton declared: "This may be Barnes’s best book. (Or that may be A Million Open Doors.) It’s a book almost everyone who likes SF will enjoy, and if it gives you a lot to think about as well, then that’s all to the good."

See also
One True

References
		

1991 American novels
1991 science fiction novels
American science fiction novels
Novels by John Barnes
Tor Books books